Eudonia antimacha is a moth of the family Crambidae. It is endemic to the Hawaiian island of Maui.

The head is white and the thorax white mixed with black.

External links

Eudonia
Endemic moths of Hawaii
Moths described in 1899